Al-Barriyya was a Palestinian village in the Ramle Subdistrict of Mandatory Palestine. It was depopulated during the 1948 Arab–Israeli War on July 10, 1948, as part of Operation Dani. It was located 5.5 km southeast of Ramla, on the eastern bank of Wadi al-Barriyya.

The area of the destroyed village has been overbuilt by Beit Hashmonai.

History
The Survey of Western Palestine (SWP) noted in 1882 that: "The name Barriyeh, 'Desert,' applied to a village, is explained by the inhabitants to be due to their ancestors having about 50 years ago lived in Abu Shusheh, whence they were expelled by the other villagers, and had to settle in the 'Desert,' or 'Outer Part.' They own most of the gardens of Abu Shusheh at the present day. This information is obtained from Mr. Bergheim."

In 1860, it was   described as a "modern village", without any antiquities.  In 1863 Victor Guérin noted that the village was situated on a low eminence, and "the few houses which compose it consist of roughly constructed huts."

An official  Ottoman village list of about 1870 showed that  it had a total of 20 houses and a population of 72, though the population count included men, only.

In 1882, PEF's Survey of Western Palestine (SWP) described as a small  adobe  hamlet, surrounded by cultivated land.

British Mandate era
After the end of  World War I, the Ottoman Empire was partitioned and a Palestine mandate was accorded to Britain by the League of Nations. In the 1922 census of Palestine conducted  by the British Mandate authorities, Bariyeh had a population of 295 residents; all Muslims,  increasing in the 1931 census to 388, still all Muslims, in a total of 86 houses.

In the 1945 statistics, the village had a population of  510  Muslims with  total of 2,831  dunums of land.  Of this, 51 dunums of land were used for plantations and irrigable land,  2,627 dunums were used for cereals, while 55 dunams were classified as built-up public areas.

1948, aftermath

The village was depopulated on July 10–13, 1948, after military assault by Yishuv forces, as part of Operation Dani.

The Israeli settlements of Azarya and  Beyt Chashmonay was constructed on village land.

In 1992 the village site was described: "The village site is mostly cleared and has been leveled except for one remaining stone house and fragments of the walls of two concrete houses with steel bars protruding from them".

References

Bibliography

External links
Welcome To al-Barriyya
 Barriyya  from the Zochrot
Survey of Western Palestine, Map 16:   IAA, Wikimedia commons  
Tal-Barriyya  from the Khalil Sakakini Cultural Center

Arab villages depopulated during the 1948 Arab–Israeli War
District of Ramla